Metabolic alkalosis is a metabolic condition in which the pH of tissue is elevated beyond the normal range (7.35–7.45). This is the result of decreased hydrogen ion concentration, leading to increased bicarbonate, or alternatively a direct result of increased bicarbonate concentrations. The condition typically cannot last long if the kidneys are functioning properly.

Signs and symptoms
Mild cases of metabolic alkalosis often cause no symptoms. Typical manifestations of moderate to severe metabolic alkalosis include abnormal sensations, neuromuscular irritability, tetany, abnormal heart rhythms (usually due to accompanying electrolyte abnormalities such as low levels of potassium in the blood), coma, seizures, and temporary waxing and waning confusion.

Causes
The causes of metabolic alkalosis can be divided into two categories, depending upon urine chloride levels.

Chloride-responsive (Urine chloride < 25 mEq/L)
 Loss of hydrogen ions – Most often occurs via two mechanisms, either vomiting or via the kidney.
 Vomiting results in the loss of hydrochloric acid (hydrogen and chloride ions) with the stomach contents. In the hospital setting this can commonly occur from nasogastric suction tubes.
 Severe vomiting also causes loss of potassium (hypokalemia) and sodium (hyponatremia). The kidneys compensate for these losses by retaining sodium in the collecting ducts at the expense of hydrogen ions (sparing sodium/potassium pumps to prevent further loss of potassium), leading to metabolic alkalosis.
Congenital chloride diarrhea – rare for being a diarrhea that causes alkalosis instead of acidosis.
  Contraction alkalosis – This results from a loss of water in the extracellular space, such as from dehydration. Decreased extracellular volume triggers the renin-angiotensin-aldosterone system, and aldosterone subsequently stimulates reabsorption of sodium (and thus water) within the nephron of the kidney. However, a second action of aldosterone is to stimulate renal excretion of hydrogen ions (while retaining bicarbonate), and it is this loss of hydrogen ions that raises the pH of the blood.
Diuretic therapy – loop diuretics and thiazides can both initially cause increase in chloride, but once stores are depleted, urine excretion will be below < 25 mEq/L. The loss of fluid from sodium excretion causes a contraction alkalosis. Diuretic abuse among athletes and people with eating disorders may present with metabolic alkalosis.
 Posthypercapnia – Hypoventilation (decreased respiratory rate) causes hypercapnia (increased levels of ), which results in respiratory acidosis. Renal compensation with excess bicarbonate retention occurs to lessen the effect of the acidosis. Once carbon dioxide levels return to base line, the higher bicarbonate levels reveal themselves putting the patient into metabolic alkalosis.
Cystic fibrosis – excessive loss of sodium chloride in the sweat leads to contraction of the extracellular volume in the same way as contraction alkalosis, as well chloride depletion.
Alkalotic agents – Alkalotic agents, such as bicarbonate (administrated in cases of peptic ulcer or hyperacidity) or antacids, administered in excess can lead to an alkalosis.

Chloride-indeterminate alkalosis
Milk alkali syndrome
Blood product administration since this contains sodium citrate which is then metabolized into sodium bicarbonate. Typically, this is seen with large volume transfusions such as more than 8 units.
Decreases in albumin and phosphate will cause metabolic alkalosis.

Chloride-resistant (Urine chloride > 40 mEq/L)
 Retention of bicarbonate – Retention of bicarbonate would lead to alkalosis.
 Shift of hydrogen ions into intracellular space – Seen in hypokalemia.  Due to a low extracellular potassium concentration, potassium shifts out of the cells. In order to maintain electrical neutrality, hydrogen shifts into the    cells, raising blood pH.
Hyperaldosteronism – Loss of hydrogen ions in the urine occurs when excess aldosterone (Conn's syndrome) increases the activity of a sodium-hydrogen exchange protein in the kidney. This increases the retention of sodium ions whilst pumping hydrogen ions into the renal tubule. Excess sodium increases extracellular volume and the loss of hydrogen ions creates a metabolic alkalosis. Later, the kidney responds through the aldosterone escape to excrete sodium and chloride in urine.
 Excess glycyrrhizin consumption
 Low levels of magnesium in the blood
 Severely high levels of calcium in the blood
 Bartter syndrome and Gitelman syndrome – syndromes with presentations analogous to taking diuretics characterized with normotensive patients
Liddle syndrome – a gain of function mutation in the genes encoding the epithelial sodium channel (ENaC) which is characterized by hypertension and hypoaldosteronism.
 11β-hydroxylase deficiency and 17α-hydroxylase deficiency – both characterized by hypertension
Aminoglycoside toxicity can induce a hypokalemic metabolic alkalosis via activating the calcium sensing receptor in the thick ascending limb of the nephron, inactivating the NKCC2 cotransporter, creating a Bartter's syndrome like effect.

Compensation
Compensation for metabolic alkalosis occurs mainly in the lungs, which retain carbon dioxide (CO2) through slower breathing, or hypoventilation (respiratory compensation). CO2 is then consumed toward the formation of the carbonic acid intermediate, thus decreasing pH. Respiratory compensation, though, is incomplete. The decrease in [H+] suppresses the peripheral chemoreceptors, which are sensitive to pH. But, because respiration slows, there is an increase in pCO2 which would cause an offset of the depression because of the action of the central chemoreceptors which are sensitive to the partial pressure of CO2 in the cerebral spinal fluid. So, because of the central chemoreceptors, respiration rate would be increased.

Renal compensation for metabolic alkalosis, less effective than respiratory compensation, consists of increased excretion of HCO3− (bicarbonate), as the filtered load of HCO3− exceeds the ability of the renal tubule to reabsorb it.

To calculate the expected p in the setting of metabolic alkalosis, the following equations are used: 
 pCO2 = 0.7 [HCO3] + 20 mmHg ± 5 
 pCO2 = 0.7 [HCO3] + 21 mmHg

Treatment
To effectively treat metabolic alkalosis, the underlying cause(s) must be corrected. A trial of intravenous chloride-rich fluid is warranted if there is a high index of suspicion for chloride-responsive metabolic alkalosis caused by loss of gastrointestinal fluid (e.g., due to vomiting).

Terminology
Alkalosis refers to a process by which the pH is increased.
Alkalemia refers to a pH which is higher than normal, specifically in the blood.

See also
 Hypokalemia
 Metabolic acidosis
 Respiratory acidosis
 Respiratory alkalosis

References

External links 

Acid–base disturbances